The member states of the International Atomic Energy Agency (IAEA) are those states which have joined the international organization that seeks to promote the peaceful use of nuclear energy, and to inhibit its use for any military purpose, including nuclear weapons. The IAEA was established as an autonomous organization on 29 July 1957. Though established independently of the United Nations through its own international treaty, the IAEA Statute, the IAEA reports to both the UN General Assembly and Security Council.  During 1956, an IAEA Statute Conference was held to draft the founding documents for the IAEA, and the IAEA Statute was completed at a conference in 1957.

List of member states
The IAEA has 176 member states as of March 2023. Most UN members and the Holy See are Member States of the IAEA.  The dates of membership are listed below.

Notes

Non-member states

Former member states

Four states have withdrawn from the IAEA.  North Korea became a member in 1974, but withdrew in 1994 after the Board of Governors found it in non-compliance with its safeguards agreement and suspended most technical cooperation.  Nicaragua became a member in 1957, withdrew its membership in 1970, and rejoined in 1977, Honduras joined in 1957, withdrew in 1967, and rejoined in 2003, while Cambodia joined in 1958, withdrew in 2003, and rejoined in 2009.

Membership approved
An additional two states have been approved for membership by the IAEA, and will become members if they deposit their instruments of ratification of the IAEA Statute.

Other states

The remaining UN member states and UN observer state, which have no relationship with the IAEA, are:

Notes

References

External links 
Member States of the IAEA - IAEA.org

International Atomic Energy Agency
International Atomic Energy Agency